Nitrobenzene is an organic compound with the chemical formula C6H5NO2.  It is a water-insoluble pale yellow oil with an almond-like odor.  It freezes to give greenish-yellow crystals.  It is produced on a large scale from benzene as a precursor to aniline.  In the laboratory, it is occasionally used as a solvent, especially for electrophilic reagents.

Production
Nitrobenzene is prepared by nitration of benzene with a mixture of concentrated sulfuric acid, water, and nitric acid.  This mixture is sometimes called "mixed acid."  The production of nitrobenzene is one of the most dangerous processes conducted in the chemical industry because of the exothermicity of the reaction (ΔH = −117 kJ/mol).

World capacity for nitrobenzene in 1985 was about 1,700,000 tonnes.

The nitration process involves formation of the nitronium ion (NO2+), followed by an electrophilic aromatic substitution reaction of it with benzene.   The nitronium ion is generated by the reaction of nitric acid and an acidic dehydration agent, typically sulfuric acid:
HNO3  +  H+     NO2+  +  H2O

Uses
Approximately 95% of nitrobenzene industrially produced is hydrogenated to aniline: 
C6H5NO2  +  3 H2  →   C6H5NH2  +  2 H2O
Aniline is a precursor to urethane polymers, rubber chemicals, pesticides, dyes (particularly azo dyes), explosives, and pharmaceuticals.

Specialized applications
Nitrobenzene is also used to mask unpleasant odors in shoe and floor polishes, leather dressings, paint solvents, and other materials.  Redistilled, as oil of mirbane, nitrobenzene had been used as an inexpensive perfume for soaps.  It has been replaced by less toxic chemicals for this purpose.  A significant merchant market for nitrobenzene is its use in the production of the analgesic paracetamol (also known as acetaminophen) (Mannsville 1991). Nitrobenzene is also used in Kerr cells, as it has an unusually large Kerr constant.  Evidence suggests its use in agriculture as a plant growth/flowering stimulant.

Organic reactions
Aside from its conversion to aniline, nitrobenzene can be selectively reduced to azoxybenzene, azobenzene, nitrosobenzene, hydrazobenzene, and  phenylhydroxylamine.  It has been used as a mild oxidant in reactions like the Skraup quinoline synthesis.

Safety
Nitrobenzene is highly toxic (Threshold Limit Value 5 mg/m3) and readily absorbed through the skin.

Prolonged exposure may cause serious damage to the central nervous system, impair vision, cause liver or kidney damage, anemia and lung irritation.  Inhalation of vapors may induce headache, nausea, fatigue, dizziness, cyanosis, weakness in the arms and legs, and in rare cases may be fatal.  The oil is readily absorbed through the skin and may increase heart rate, cause convulsions or rarely death.  Ingestion may similarly cause headaches, dizziness, nausea, vomiting and gastrointestinal irritation, loss of sensation/use in limbs and also causes internal bleeding.

Nitrobenzene is considered a likely human carcinogen by the United States Environmental Protection Agency, and is classified by the IARC as a Group 2B carcinogen which is "possibly carcinogenic to humans".  It has been shown to cause liver, kidney, and thyroid adenomas and carcinomas in rats.

It is classified as an extremely hazardous substance in the United States as defined in Section 302 of the U.S. Emergency Planning and Community Right-to-Know Act (42 U.S.C. 11002), and is subject to strict reporting requirements by facilities which produce, store, or use it in significant quantities.

Popular culture

 The 1927 short story The Avenging Chance by Anthony Berkeley discusses contemporary uses of nitrobenzene. It is also at the center of the plot in Berkeley's The Poisoned Chocolates Case of 1929.
 In the 1937 Nero Wolfe detective novel The Red Box by Rex Stout, a person is murdered by having nitrobenzene (also called "essence of mirbane") spilled on him in his car.
 In the 1960 story "The Santa Claus Club" by Julian Symons a person is murdered by nitrobenzene.

References

External links 
International Chemical Safety Card 0065
NIOSH Pocket Guide to Chemical Hazards
IARC Monograph: "Nitrobenzene"
US EPA factsheet
https://patents.google.com/patent/US9113628

 
Nitro solvents
IARC Group 2B carcinogens
Nonlinear optical materials
Aromatic solvents
Phenyl compounds